Lynbrook High School (also referred to as Lynbrook or LHS) is a co-educational, public, four-year high school located in the West San Jose neighborhood of San Jose, California. It was founded in 1965 and graduated its first class in 1968.

Lynbrook is in the Fremont Union High School District along with Monta Vista High School, Cupertino High School, Fremont High School, and Homestead High School. It is fairly close to Miller Middle School. It is accredited by the Western Association of Schools and Colleges.

Several measures rank Lynbrook as one of the best high schools in the San Francisco Bay Area, California and the nation. In 2016, Newsweek ranked Lynbrook as the 29th best high school in the United States. Another report of public and private high schools by Business Insider and Niche ranked the students' average SAT/ACT scores as 7th nationwide.  The Los Angeles Times ranked Lynbrook first among all public high schools in California using a similar metric.  Separately, U.S. News & World Report ranked the school as the 17th best in the nation for Science, Technology, Engineering and Math (STEM). A larger percentage of its graduates are accepted into the University of California (UC) system than at any other school in the Fremont Union High School District.

History

Lynbrook High School opened on September 13, 1965, with an enrollment of 1,026 freshmen and sophomores. Because Cupertino High School had grown very large by that time, a new school in the West San Jose area was constructed. The District Board nominated Kendall Stanger as the first principal of the school. The school was technologically advanced around the time it was built and had closed-circuit television and air conditioning. During the first year, there was no gymnasium, locker room, or swimming pool. By the second school year, the gymnasium, locker room, and an Olympic-size swimming pool had been built.

Campus
Many of Lynbrook's buildings and facilities are in their original state and have not been significantly renovated until 2019, when the quad and cafeteria was under construction for a year and finished renovations  2019. Construction for the gym and main student parking lot have been completed. However, the bleachers in the main gym were replaced between 2003 and 2006. Most of Lynbrook's buildings are constructed of old red brick exteriors. New structures and facilities built since 1990 include the library, swimming pool, field house, and special education buildings. During the summer in 2009, the parking lot was renovated and solar panels were added. In the fall of 2012, the football field and track was renovated, including new lights. The library has also been redesigned.

Lynbrook has a football field with a synthetic track around it, a baseball field, and a field hockey/soccer field, also known as Stober field. Lynbrook's Olympic-sized swimming pool is in excellent condition. During water polo season, Lynbrook's nine-lane swimming pool devotes about half of its area to non-lane-divided deep-water areas. The deep-water area is used mainly for water polo competitions. The pool was renovated in the summer of 2009, and no longer has diving boards. The softball and field hockey areas were renovated in 2006-2007.

A new building that houses the new weight room and dance studio was added west of the Field House during the 2017-2018 school year and opened for use in May 2018. This construction is the first of three stages of campus renovation. Stage two began in the summer of 2018 with the demolition of the quad, cafeteria, and old dance studio building. The new quad and cafeteria have since opened and when they have completed stage 3 of the renovation will begin with an added gym lobby, new main office, and a widespread re-arranging of building usage.

The classroom wings are on the back (east) side of the school and are numbered from 101-615. The 100 and 200 wings are on the north side, and the 500 and 600 wings are on the south side. The gymnasium, swimming pool, and tennis and basketball courts are situated on the southwest side of Lynbrook's campus. The western third of the campus consists of the Stober field (a large green lawn used primarily for field hockey practice and student events) and a football field. The visual and performing arts center is the school's easternmost building. The school's mural of the Viking, which faces the main parking lot, is painted on the building that houses the girls' locker rooms and the weight training room.

The quad is the hub of student life at Lynbrook and is surrounded by the cafeteria, classroom wings, auditorium, and the gym. School-wide homecoming skits were performed in the quad until it was demolished, during construction they take place on the blacktop near the tennis courts. Other student activities that took place in the old quad, including "Club Food Day" and homecoming skits, are also now held near the tennis courts. On Club Food Day, participating clubs set up tables and fundraise by selling food and drinks. Spirit Weeks, week-long events put on by the Associated Student Body (ASB), were also held in the quad. Spirit weeks culminate in a school-wide rally at the end of the week, located in the main gym. While the bleachers in the main gym were being replaced, rallies were held outdoors in the quad.

Academics
Lynbrook has widely been known for consistently being one of the top 20 academic high schools in California for several years. Lynbrook's academic reputation has also influenced the real estate market in the surrounding neighborhood, causing home prices to rise higher than other neighborhoods in the San Jose area.

As of 2011, Lynbrook High School's base Academic Performance Index (API) is 943, which is 201 points higher than the state average for high schools, and is similar to those of Saratoga, Mission San Jose, and Monta Vista. The API ranking for Lynbrook High School is 19 out of 19, which is the best rating possible for any school, and its similar-schools API ranking is 9 out of 10. In 2008, Lynbrook was ranked 6th out of all public schools in the state of California, excluding magnet schools, based on API scores. In 2009, the U.S. News & World Report ranked Lynbrook as the 98th best high school in the United States. In 2007, the school scored a 10 out of 10 in both API Statewide and Similar School ranking.

Lynbrook students consistently receive high marks on standardized exams, including the SAT and Advanced Placement Exams.  A report of public and private high schools by Business Insider and Niche ranked the students' average SAT/ACT scores as 7th nationwide.  The Los Angeles Times ranked Lynbrook first among all public high schools in California using a similar metric.  On the SAT Reasoning Test, the mean critical reading score for the class of 2012 was 636/800, the mean writing score was 668/800, and the mean mathematics score was 696/800. The mean composite score on the SAT was a 2000/2400. Out of 1585 tests taken by 672 students who took Advanced Placement Exams in May 2012, 57% scored a 5, the highest score possible, and 94% of the people passed by scoring a 3 or higher.

Lynbrook produced 62 National Merit semifinalists, and 93 commended students from the class of 2013, which is the highest proportion based on the size of the graduating class (431) out of all of the high schools in the Fremont Union High School District.

Between 1999 and 2018, Lynbrook High School students won 37 semi-finalist and 7 finalist awards in the Regeneron Science Talent Search.  This was among the highest number of award winners of all high schools in the country.

93% of Lynbrook students passed the English-portion of the CAHSEE and 95% passed the mathematics portion.

Lynbrook has a relatively high proportion of high student GPA's, and the top 10 percent of students have a GPA from 3.97 to 4.00. More than half of all Lynbrook graduates attend the University of California, making Lynbrook one of the university's largest feeders. Not all students attend four-year colleges; about one-fourth attend two-year colleges such as nearby  De Anza College before transferring to other institutions.

In 2009–2010, Lynbrook had a total of 6 semifinalists, two finalists, and one 2nd-place student from the Intel Science Talent Search, one of the most prestigious science competitions in America.

In 2010, Lynbrook had 8 qualifiers for the USAMO (USA Mathematical Olympiad) and 8 for the USAJMO (USA Junior Mathematical Olympiad), some of the most prestigious math competitions in the nation.

In 2011, Lynbrook was recognized at a Gala Dinner in Washington DC as an Intel School of Distinction Winner in science. Lynbrook is one of only six schools (two elementary, two middle and two high schools, each for either math or science) in the nation to receive this recognition.

Athletics and extracurriculars

Sports
Lynbrook is a member of the California Interscholastic Federation. It offers a total of 16 distinct varsity and JV sports, with sports split into two different seasons for girls and boys (such as tennis and volleyball) counted as one sport.
Lynbrook has confirmed employment of the controversial judge in the Brock Turner case, Mr. Michael Aaron Persky, as the high school's new coach of the Junior Varsity Girls Tennis Team. Persky was recalled as a judge by Santa Clara County voters in 2018 for his handling of the Turner case (the first judge to be recalled in California since 1932).

The school made the following statement regarding Persky's employment:
"Mr. Persky is in his first year as an athletic coach in our District. He applied for the open coaching position over the summer and successfully completed all of the District’s hiring requirements before starting as a coach, including a fingerprint background check. He was a highly qualified applicant, having attended several tennis coaching clinics for youth and holds a high rating from the United States Tennis Association."

ASB
Lynbrook ASB, or Leadership, consists of 7 ASB Officers, 25 commissioners, and 21 class officers. ASB officers and commissioners focus on schoolwide projects. Class officers plan various class events such as Homecoming, Powerpuff, rallies, proms, and fundraisers. The Freshmen, Sophomores, and Juniors have 5 officers, and the Seniors have 6. ASB also serves as a liaison for school administration, Legislative Council, FUHSD Inter-District Council (IDC), and parent and community organizations like PTSA and School Site Council (SSC).

Tech
The Tech commission brings innovative technologies to Lynbrook, documents major school events, and manages all technology present in the promotion and execution of ASB events. In order to spread awareness of events and promote our school, the Tech Commissioners take photos and videos of ASB events including rallies, brunch activities, and dances. They help publicize events, manage the Student Life portion of the LHS website, and work with other technical aspects such as filming and operating the sound system.  Tech had also DJed a few of LHS dances in the last few years.

Community Link
Community Link intersects the responsibilities of overseeing organizations on Lynbrook's campus and focuses on greater outreach to the community. Commissioners are responsible for creating a platform to facilitate communication between the school's student body, administration, as well as groups outside in the community.

Public Relations
The PR Commission promotes school-wide events, increases transparency, and informs the student body through ASB Videos. Public Relations Commissioners provide much-needed service to our student body by promoting ASB events and activities including homecoming, dances, spirit weeks, etc. through announcements, posters, flyers, stickers and other creative ways.

Recognition
Recognition Commissioners help promote a positive and supportive school environment by planning annual events like Kindness Week, Finals Campus Wellness Week, and the Coffeehouse Talent Show. Recognition aims to appreciate all students and teachers for their hard work and dedication through awards like student VIP Vikings and Staff Appreciation Week, and they seek to recognize underrepresented groups and individuals on campus. In addition to celebrating faculty and student accomplishments, this commission runs the Facebook and Instagram page known as Humans of Lynbrook High, featuring interviews from students and staff.

Social
Social commissioners are in charge of overseeing, publicizing, and planning events, such as school dances, movie nights, and the fashion show, for students to get together and socialize.

Spirit
Spirit Commissioners play the biggest role in rallies by organizing the themes, games, script, and presentation of sports teams. During the rallies, they may have the center stage as MCs. They also run several other events throughout the year aiming to increase student participation. During other events, they may introduce activities, classes, speakers, etc. They work closely with Tech in video production and will work to promote student involvement in all activities.

IDC
The Intra-District Council promotes positive relationships between students and ASBs across the FUHSD district. The IDC represents the voices of Lynbrook students and takes inspiration from other schools to better Lynbrook and every student’s Lynbrook experience. The IDC for each school consists of two representatives and the ASB President.

Class Officers
Class Officers are representatives elected my members of their class to lead and serve their grade level. Class Officers plan various events and initiatives such as Homecoming, Powerpuff, Fundraisers and more. Each grade consists of 1 President, 2 VPs (3 for the senior class), 1 Secretary and 1 Treasurer

Demographics

Like most other American high schools, Lynbrook is a four-year high school that consists of freshman, sophomore, junior, and senior classes. As of the 2016-2017 school year, Lynbrook High School had a total of 1,741 students, with 449 students belonging to the senior class of 2014.

84% of students are Asian and 7% are White.  Like many top high schools in the Bay Area , Lynbrook's student body is primarily Chinese American, with a growing Indian American population.

School boundaries
Lynbrook High School's boundaries comprise the western part of West San Jose and parts of northern Saratoga. The school's area is bound to the north by Bollinger Road, to the east by Saratoga Creek, to the south by Cox Avenue, and to the west by De Anza Boulevard.

Currently, the Residency Verification policy states that all students who are enrolled in Lynbrook High School must be physically residing within the district's boundaries. The Residency Verification Anonymous Hotline is one of the district's ways of helping to enforce the policy (see Fremont Union High School District). However, a small number of students live elsewhere but are allowed enrollment due to lottery enrollment or by exceptions from the district.

Curriculum

Policies and grading
Lynbrook High School's most important policies are covered by the Fremont Union High School District's main policies, including the Zero Tolerance Policy, Academic Code of Conduct, and Residency Verification. They are all stated in the first few pages of the Student Planner. Assistant principals and the Student Legislative Council set minor policies and school rules.

AP and honors courses
Lynbrook offers a total of 17 different AP courses (counting AP Calculus AB and BC as two separate courses) and 8 different honors courses.

Graduation requirements
A minimum of 220 semester units are required for graduation from Lynbrook High School. Ten units equal one year of work for each period.

Lynbrook's electives include 3D Design, Art, Architecture, Principles of Business, Virtual Enterprise, Engineering Tech, Choir, Computer-Aided Design (Drafting), Java, Computer Science, Computer Applications, Spanish, Chinese, French, Japanese, Marching Band, Wind Ensemble, and Orchestra. Physical education is a required course for freshmen, but sophomores have the opportunity to take a sport for credit instead. Sophomores who choose to take a PE class have the opportunity to take PE Athletics (Team Sports), Racquet Sports, PE Basketball, Weight Training, or Weight Training instead of PE 10.

School technology
Lynbrook considers itself a technology-literate school which uses the Internet as the primary means of communication. As of 2020, in all schools within the Fremont Union High School District, teachers, administrators, and students use Schoology for announcements, discussions, assignments and schedules. Schoology can also be used for posting e-mail addresses and files.

Teachers use Turnitin, Infinite Campus, and other such websites to post grades and collect and evaluate papers.

The school library also has 36 public terminals for student use. Two computer labs in Rooms 005 and 006 are only for use by classes that have made appointments with the school, but students may access the computers during Monday and Thursday tutorial periods.

Notable alumni

 Craig Juntunen (Class of 1974) - Former CFL quarterback
Brian Matthew Krzanich (Class of 1978) - Former CEO of Intel
 Chris Larsen (Class of 1979) - Co-Founder & Executive Chairman of Ripple (payment protocol)
 Chris Cavanaugh (Class of 1980) - Former Olympic swimmer, winning the gold medal in the 4 × 100 m freestyle relay at the 1984 Summer Olympics
 Greg Camp (Class of 1985) - Former lead guitarist and songwriter for the band Smash Mouth
 Gina Bianchini (Class of 1990) - Former CEO of Ning
 Kurt Kuenne (Class of 1990) - Filmmaker and composer known for the documentary Dear Zachary
 Kristie Lu Stout (Class of 1992) - CNN International Anchor/Correspondent
 Boris Bershteyn (Class of 1995) – former acting Administrator of the Office of Information and Regulatory Affairs
 Hua Hsu (Class of 1995) - Professor and writer
 Sanjit Biswas (Class of 1998) - Former CEO and a co-founder of Meraki. CEO and co-founder of Samsara.
 Richard Kim (Class of 1999) - Korean-American car designer, known for his work on the BMW i3 and i8 electric cars
 Vinay Bhat (Class of 2002) - Grandmaster of chess
 Tony Xu (Class of 2003) - CEO and co-Founder of DoorDash
 Charlie Yin (Class of 2007) - Electronic music producer that performs under the name Giraffage

References

External links 

 
 Fremont Union High School District (FUHSD)
 "Map" or layout of buildings on campus

Educational institutions established in 1965
Fremont Union High School District
High schools in San Jose, California
Public high schools in California
1965 establishments in California